Flor Ramos Contemplacion (January 7, 1953 – March 17, 1995) was a Filipino domestic worker executed in Singapore after being convicted for murdering two individuals.

Her execution severely strained relations between Singapore and the Philippines.

Early life
Contemplacion was born in San Pablo City, Laguna, Philippines.

Background of case 

On 4 May 1991, Delia Mamaril Maga (born on October 6, 1955 in Tarlac), a Filipino domestic worker, was found strangled to death in Singapore. A three-year-old boy, Nicholas Huang, whom Maga had been taking care of, was discovered drowned. Although Huang's father could not identify a suspect, the police learnt about Contemplacion through Maga's diary. The police interrogated Contemplacion, who initially confessed to the crimes of murdering Maga and Huang. Contemplacion never retracted her confession, and the Philippine Embassy in Singapore deemed her confession credible.

Trial 
On 29 January 1993, Flor Contemplacion was sentenced to death by hanging.

Appeal 
On appeal, the case was sent back to the same trial judge to allow medical evidence to be heard. The defence then introduced medical evidence claiming that she had been suffering from a partial complex seizure (an unusual form of epilepsy) at the time of the killings, while the prosecution's medical evidence maintained that she was only suffering from a mild migraine on that day. The defence's medical evidence was rejected and she was again found guilty and sentenced to death. She received minimal consular support from the Philippine Embassy in Singapore throughout her trial and there was no representative from the Philippine Embassy present in court throughout the duration of the trial. The Department of Foreign Affairs and the Philippine Embassy in Singapore showed an active interest only in the weeks leading up to Contemplacion's execution, when emotions in the Philippines were running high.

Philippines President Fidel V. Ramos wrote to Singapore President Ong Teng Cheong twice, once to grant clemency to Contemplacion and the other to delay execution to evaluate purported new evidence which had surfaced. Another Filipino maid, Emilia Frenilla, who had returned to the Philippines, alleged that she had overheard a conversation claiming Huang drowned during an epileptic seizure and Maga was killed by the child's relatives over his death. She subsequently left Singapore in fear of her life.

The Alex Boncayao Brigade, a Filipino assassination unit of the Philippine New People's Army, threatened to kill Filipino officials and diplomats if they fail to stop Contemplacion's execution.

Execution 

Contemplacion was hanged at dawn on 17 March 1995 at the Changi Women's Prison and Drug Rehabilitation Centre despite a personal plea for clemency to the Singaporean government from Philippine President Fidel Ramos.

Aftermath
Although President Ramos seemed initially resigned to the execution, he called Contemplacion a heroine. His wife, First Lady Amelita Ramos, went to receive Contemplacion's coffin at Ninoy Aquino International Airport in Manila on 19 March. Contemplacion's body was carried from the airport to San Pablo, and thousands of Filipinos lined the route. President Ramos sent a wreath to Contemplacion's wake and offered financial assistance to Contemplacion's four children, who were dependent on their mother's income as a domestic worker, pledging one month of his salary to a scholarship fund.  Prelates of the local Catholic Church also condemned the execution.

There were several protests held across the Philippines over Contemplacion's execution, some of which were organized by politicians and labor organizations. Thousands of Singapore flags were burned in the protests. In one of the protests, the mayor of Davao City and future Philippine president, Rodrigo Duterte, burned a flag of Singapore while leading 1,000 employees of Davao City in protest.

Many Filipinos believed that Contemplacion was innocent or at least insane, blaming the Singaporean government for a lack of compassion, and the Philippine government for not doing enough to stop the execution. The Philippine Embassy in Singapore in particular was criticised since it did not even have a consular representative as an observer in court throughout the trial. The Philippine Secretary of Foreign Affairs, Roberto Romulo, and Secretary of Labor and Employment, Nieves Confesor, both resigned as a result of the controversy.

Several threats against Singaporeans and Singapore properties in the Philippines were reported. Singaporean tourists either shortened or canceled their holiday trips in the Philippines in view of their safety. Singaporean workers working in the Philippines either left the country or were recalled back to Singapore by their companies.

Following the execution, Prime Minister Goh Chok Tong's planned trip to Manila, which was at the invitation of President Ramos, was postponed. President Ramos recalled the Filipino ambassador to Singapore, and many bilateral exchanges between the countries were cancelled.

A Presidential Fact Finding Commission was setup in the Philippines to investigate Contemplacion's case and the findings were submitted to President Ramos on 6 April 1995. In a statement by President Ramos, a protective programme was approved to oversee the welfare of overseas Filipinos with the deployment of government staff, lawyers and doctors to various countries. In response to the findings, the Singapore government rejected the findings but agreed to President Ramos's request to examine Maga’s remains by two Singaporean pathologists and three foreign consultants.

The first autopsy done by Singaporean pathologists concluded that Maga died of asphyxia due to strangulation which was disputed by the Philippines' National Bureau of Investigation experts. A final autopsy was conducted in July by an independent panel, whose results and would be final, and both governments required to accept the findings. If the findings determined that Maga did not die of asphyxia, the Singapore government will reopen Contemplacion's case and re-investigate the deaths of Maga and Huang. The independent panel ultimately did determine that Maga's cause of death was asphyxia, which the Philippines government accepted.

Philippines and Singapore began to reconcile their bilateral relations.

In popular culture
The Flor Contemplacion Story, directed by Joel Lamangan and starring Nora Aunor in the role of Contemplacion, was released by Viva Entertainment and also won Best Picture in the Cairo Film Festival in 1995.

The story of the victim starring Gina Alajar in the role of Delia Maga was also featured in another film by Regal Films and Golden Lions Films Productions, Victim No. 1: Delia Maga (Jesus, Pray for Us! : A Massacre In Singapore) , directed by Carlo J. Caparas.

In 1995, there is another documentary film of both Flor Contemplacion and Delia Maga in 1995 film called Bagong Bayani (aka "A New Hero" or "Unsung Heroine"), directed by Tikoy Aguiluz. Starring Helen Gamboa as Flor Contemplacion and Chanda Romero as Delia Maga.

The case of Flor Contemplacion was also featured in an episode of GMA Network's crime documentary program,Case Unclosed.

The aftermath of Flor Contemplacion's family after her execution was dramatized on GMA Network's drama anthology series, Magpakailanman, starring Alessandra de Rossi as Flor's daughter Russel, who was suffered from a string of unfortunate events after her mother's death including her husband's drug addiction, the imprisonment of her father and siblings from drugs, and hardships on balancing worktime and motherhood. The episode was titled "Life After the Death of Flor Contemplacion" and originally aired on April 13, 2013.

See also

 Capital punishment in Singapore
 Filipinos in Singapore
 Philippines-Singapore relations
 Sarah Balabagan, a Filipino maid convicted of murder in United Arab Emirates

References

Further reading
Regional Briefing Philippines: Death Threat (March 23, 1995).  Far Eastern Economic Review, p. 13.
Rose-Coloured Glasses (March 30, 1995).  Far Eastern Economic Review, p. 12.
Manila Justice: Executed Filipina Hailed as Hero (March 30, 1995). Far Eastern Economic Review, p. 5.
Regional Briefing Philippines: Autopsy Conflict (April 13, 1995). Far Eastern Economic Review, p. 13.
Regional Briefing Philippines: Singapore Reopens Case (April 20, 1995). Far Eastern Economic Review, p. 13.
The Fight For Flor (March 24, 1995). Asiaweek, p. 27.
The Furor Over Flor (March 31, 1995). Asiaweek, p. 36.
Beyond the Rage: Lessons from the Case of Flor Contemplacion (April 7, 1995). Asiaweek, p. 17.
The Fallout From Flor: A President's Political Worries Over a Hanged Maid (April 7, 1995). Asiaweek, p. 30.
Savage Blows (April 14, 1995). Asiaweek, p. 33.
More Fallout From Flor (April 28, 1995). Asiaweek, p. 34.

External links 

1953 births
1995 deaths
Filipino migrant workers
20th-century executions by Singapore
Executed Filipino women
Filipinos convicted of murder
Filipino people executed abroad
Filipino domestic workers
People convicted of murder by Singapore
People executed for murder
People from San Pablo, Laguna
Philippines–Singapore relations
Murder in Singapore